Bruno Kerbl is an Austrian retired slalom canoeist who competed from the mid-1950s to the mid-1960s. He won two bronze medals in the C-2 team event at the ICF Canoe Slalom World Championships, earning them in 1955 and 1963.

References

Austrian male canoeists
Possibly living people
Year of birth missing (living people)
Medalists at the ICF Canoe Slalom World Championships